Ernestine Bayer (born March 25, 1909 – September 10, 2006), her parents were Henry and Rosetta Steppacher, and she was born Philadelphia. She has been called the "Mother of Women's Rowing". She started rowing at a time when it was unheard of for women and paved the way for other women to follow after her.

Rowing career
Ernestine met Ernest Bayer and they were married on January 28, 1928. Ernest raced in a coxless four in the 1928 Summer Olympics and won a silver medal. In 1938 Ernestine founded the Philadelphia Girls' Rowing Club (PGRC). Following Title IX in 1972, she became a volunteer coach for the women's club at the University of New Hampshire. In 1980 she became the first woman to be awarded the John J. Carlin service award by the U.S. Rowing Association. In 1989, Bayer rowed in the World Rowing Organization's Masters Regatta that was held in the United States for the first time. In 1991 she competed in the Florida Masters Regatta and won in a mixed double and the single. Earlier that year she had competed in the Crash B indoor races in Boston and established a world record in her age bracket. In 1992 at age 83, she won her age division, 60 and over, in the Head of the Charles race. She was United States Rowing Sullivan Award nominee that year.  At the age of 91 she set the world record on the Concept II rowing ergometer for women over the age of 90. Also that year she competed in the Master's World Championships in Montreal winning the women's double, the women's eight, and taking 2nd in the mixed double.

Death
Ernestine suffered her first stroke in March 2003. She recovered enough to be able to row in a double. In July 2005, she had a second stroke which left her paralyzed on her right side and unable to speak. She died September 10, 2006 at the age of 97. She was predeceased by her husband in 1997. They are survived by their daughter Tina.

References

External links
https://web.archive.org/web/20070312050725/http://www.seacoastonline.com/news/exeter/01272006/news/84914.htm

1909 births
2006 deaths
Place of birth missing
American female rowers
20th-century American women
20th-century American people
21st-century American women